Devil Sister, is a feel-good romantic Thai television series about love between a girl in the devil disguise and the boy next door starring Pechaya Wattanamontree and Metawin Opas-iamkajorn based on the novel "Beauty and the Guy". Produced by GMMTV together with Keng Kwang Kang and directed by Ekkasit Trakulkasemsuk and Pantip Vibultham. It was one of the television series for 2022 showcased by GMMTV during their "BORDERLESS" event on December 1, 2021. This series officially premiered on April 18, 2022 on GMM 25, it's air every Monday and Tuesday at 8:30 P.M.

Synopsis 
Irin (Min Pechaya), the it girl running Bannasorn Publishing House, is crowned "the devil" for her tempestuous and fearless demeanor. But what nobody knows is that it is all an act. The truth is Irin only puts up a mean front just so her younger sister, Inn (Piploy Kanyarat), can stand out and be adored by all. But no matter how well Irin puts on such a cattish act, she can never stop her younger next-door neighbor Namcha (Win Metawin) from falling in love with her. In fact, Irin and Namcha used to date when they were students, but for some reason, Irin broke things off without an explanation and devastated Namcha in the process. Namcha is now a veterinarian working in a hospital, and since he's never forgotten his first love, he's ready to do whatever it takes this time around to get back together with the love of his life. Since Irin won't believe he is still in love with her, Namcha makes it his mission to prove her wrong. Unfortunately for them, this second chance at love is somehow full of obstacles because Inn has also been in love with Namcha for a long time and is working with none other than their family's lawyer Jin (Pod Suphakorn) to sabotage her sister's relationship. Jin himself, through some elaborate schemes, is working to gain the trust of both Irin and her grandfather to take care of the family. And then comes Ploychan (Ticha Kanticha), the owner of a dog farm who's helping Namcha and his hospital with an ulterior motive by using her dog, Action, as a go-between. Love should come easy for the two of them, but family, work, and even friends all seem to tear them apart. How will this love be for Irin and Namcha?

Cast and characters

Main

Supporting

Soundtracks

International broadcast 
This series is available on streaming platform VIU in Indonesia, Malaysia, Singapore, Hongkong and Myanmar. It was also broadcast on Japan television station TV Asahi CS TeleAsa Channel 1 on July 2, 2022. In the Philippines, GMA Network acquired the rights to air Devil Sister under the network's The Heart of Asia programming block, using the title Beauty and the Guy. Youku one of the leading online video and streaming service platforms in China announced its licensing of Devil Sister. This drama available to stream on the platform starting from March 9, 2023.

Production 
GMMTV's first attempt at adapting Beauty and the Guy was announced in October 2019. It was titled Devil Sister (รักของนางร้าย). However, in September 2020, GMMTV revealed that Devil Sister was cancelled due to the COVID-19 pandemic. GMMTV ultimately decided to revive the project with an entirely new cast, making the official announcement at the "Borderless" event on December 1, 2021.

Reception 
The first episode of Devil Sister was trending on Twitter in 8 countries around the world, it's trending number 1 in Thailand, Indonesia, Vietnam and Philippines. Trending number 2 Worldwide, Singapore and Malaysia. Number 16  in South Korea and number 38 in Mexico.

Average TV viewership ratings 

 the  number represents the lowest ratings and the  number represents the highest ratings.

References

External links 
 GMMTV
 Official Trailer

Television series by GMMTV
Thai romantic comedy television series
Television series by Keng Kwang Kang